{{Infobox settlement
| name                   = Fafin
| native_name            = فافين
| native_name_lang       = ar
| type                   = Village
| pushpin_map            = Syria
| pushpin_label_position = bottom
| pushpin_mapsize        = 250
| pushpin_map_caption    = Location of Fafin in Syria
| coordinates            = 
| subdivision_type        = Country
| subdivision_name        = 
| subdivision_type1       = Governorate
| subdivision_name1       = Aleppo
| subdivision_type2       = District
| subdivision_name2       = Azaz
| subdivision_type3       = Subdistrict
| subdivision_name3       = Mare'
| parts_type              = Control
| parts_style             = para
| p1                      =  Autonomous Administration of North and East Syria
| elevation_m             = 
| population              = 3183
| population_density_km2  = auto
| population_as_of        = 2004
| population_footnotes    = {{#tag:ref|{{cite web |title=2004 Census Data for ''Nahiya Mare|url=http://www.cbssyr.sy/new%20web%20site/General_census/census_2004/NH/TAB02-25-2004.htm |publisher=Syrian Central Bureau of Statistics |language=ar }} Also available in English: |name=census2004}}
| timezone                = EET
| utc_offset              = +2
| timezone_DST            = EEST
| utc_offset_DST          = +3
| geocode                 = C1640
| website                 = 
}}Fafin''' is a village in northern Aleppo Governorate, northwestern Syria. The village had a population of 3,183 as per the 2004 census.

References

Populated places in Azaz District
Villages in Aleppo Governorate